Agelaius is a genus of blackbirds in the New World family Icteridae. Established by Louis Jean Pierre Vieillot in 1816, it contains five species:

The name Agelaius comes from the Greek , meaning "gregarious".

Gallery

References

 
American blackbirds
Bird genera
Taxa named by Louis Jean Pierre Vieillot